The Forså Hydroelectric Power Station ( or Forså kraftstasjon) is a hydroelectric power station in the municipality of Gildeskål in Nordland county, Norway. Part of the plant's catchment area also lies in the municipality of Beiarn.

The plant was originally built by Norsk Hydro to supply industry at Glomfjord and is now owned by Salten Kraftsamband. It came into operation in 1963. The water that leaves the plant is later reused by the Sundsfjord Hydroelectric Power Station.

See also

References

Hydroelectric power stations in Norway
Gildeskål
Beiarn
Energy infrastructure completed in 1963
1963 establishments in Norway